Choripetalae Eichler (1876), is a descriptive botanical name used in the Eichler and Wettstein systems for a group of flowering plants. It was one of two groups within the Dicotyledones, the other being the Sympetalae. The latter have fused petals (sympetaly) which distinguishes them from the free, unfused petals of the Choripetalae.

Thus if the petals are free from one another in the corolla, the plant is polypetalous or choripetalous; while if the petals are at least partially fused together, it is gamopetalous or sympetalous.

See also
 Petal

References

Historically recognized angiosperm taxa